Fabrizio Gifuni (born 16 July 1966) is an Italian stage, film and television actor. He won two Silver Ribbons and a David di Donatello Award.

Life and career 
Born in Rome, the son of the politician Gaetano, Gifuni enrolled at the Silvio D'Amico National Academy of Dramatic Art,  graduating in 1992. He made his film debut in 1996, in La bruttina stagionata. Two years later he had his breakout role as Pelaia in Gianni Amelio's The Way We Laughed, then in 1999 he received a nomination for Best Actor at the David di Donatello for his performance in A Love.

In 2002 Gifuni was appointed EFP Shooting Star at the Berlin International Film Festival for his performance in Giuseppe Bertolucci's Probably Love. In 2003 thanks to his performance in The Best of Youth he received her second nomination for David di Donatello and won the Nastro d'Argento for Best Actor along with the rest of the male cast. He received a third nomination for David di Donatello in 2012, for Marco Tullio Giordana's Piazza Fontana: The Italian Conspiracy.

In 2014 he won the David di Donatello for Best Supporting Actor and the Nastro d'Argento for Best Actor for his role in Human Capital.

Personal life  
Gifuni is married to actress Sonia Bergamasco.

He was son of politician Gaetano Gifuni, former Secretary General of the Italian President from 1992 to 2006 and former Minister for Parliamentary Relations in 1987.

Selected filmography 
The Way We Laughed (1998) 
A Love (1999) 
Johnny the Partisan (2000) 
La Carbonara (2000) 
 This Is Not Paradise (2000)
Empty Eyes (2001) 
Probably Love (2001) 
Winter (2002) 
The Best of Youth (2003) 
 Miss F (2007) 
 The Sweet and the Bitter (2007) 
 The Girl by the Lake (2007) 
 Paul VI: The Pope in the Tempest (2008) 
 Galantuomini (2008) 
 The Cézanne Affair (2009) 
Dark Love (2010) 
C'era una volta la città dei matti... (2010) 
Kryptonite! (2011) 
Piazza Fontana: The Italian Conspiracy (2012) 
La leggenda di Kaspar Hauser (2012) 
Human Capital (2013)
Sweet Dreams (2016)
The Beast (2020)

References

External links 
 
 

1966 births
People of Apulian descent
People of Sicilian descent
Male actors from Rome
Italian male stage actors
Italian male film actors
Italian male television actors
Living people
21st-century Italian male actors
Accademia Nazionale di Arte Drammatica Silvio D'Amico alumni
Nastro d'Argento winners
David di Donatello winners